The 2018–19 Biathlon World Cup – Stage 8 was the eighth event of the season and was held in Salt Lake City, United States, from 14–17 February 2019.

Schedule of events 
The events took place at the following times.

Medal winners

Men

Women

Mixed

References 

2018–19 Biathlon World Cup
2019 in sports in Utah
Biathlon World Cup - Stage 8
Biathlon competitions in the United States
Sports competitions in Utah